Argyroploce aquilonana is a species of moth belonging to the family Tortricidae.

It is native to Northern Europe and Northern America.

References

Olethreutini
Moths described in 1932